Sui Southern Gas Company Football Club, commonly known as SSGC or Sui Southern Gas is a professional football club based in Karachi, Sindh, Pakistan, which plays in the Pakistan Premier League, the top tier of Pakistani football.

They play at the Punjab Stadium and sometimes at Korangi Baloch Stadium. They share a rivalry with Sui Northern Gas Pipelines Limited F.C. The matches between two sides are known as the "Sui Derby".

On 17 September 2018, the club has won single-leg promotion play-offs 7–1 against Gwadar Port Authority, which earned them a promotion to 2018–19 Pakistan Premier League.

History 
Sui Southern Gas Company first competed in 1996 PFF President's Cup, where they were placed in group with Pakistan Army and Pakistan Telecommunication, Sui Gas lost both their matches 5–0 and 3–2 respectively. In 1998, the club competed in the 1998 President's Cup, losing and drawing their group stage matches 2–0 and 3–3 to Crescent Textiles Mills and Karachi Port Trust as they were knocked out of the tournament finishing third.
In 1999, the club took part in All Pakistan Dr Abdul Qadeer Khan Football Tournament, in which they were knocked out in the first match after losing to Mahfooz Club in preliminary round. Their next tournament participation in All-Pakistan Prime Minister's Peace Cup saw them losing 5–1 to Pakistan Public Work Department. In 1999 PFF Cup, Sui Southern Gas recorded their first ever win when they defeated Karachi Metropolitan Corporation 2–0 in group stage after drawing 0–0 with Pakistan Airlines, it was the first time ever that Sui Gas qualified to second round in any competition. In Round of 16, they drew 2–2 with WAPDA, losing 5–4 on penalties.
Sui Gas' first appearance in the National Championship came in 2000, when reached the Round of 16, only to be knocked out by eventual winners Allied Bank. In 2003, the club reached the semi-finals of the inaugural All-Pakistan Tapal Tezdum Invitation Football Tournament, where they lost 1–0 Karachi Electric Supply Corporation. The same year Sui Gas were runners-up to Habib Bank after losing 4–2 on penalties in the finals of All Pakistan Shaheed Zulfiqar Ali Bhutto Memorial Football Tournament.

2004 to present 
Sui Gas played in the second division, PFF National League (now known as PFF League) in 2005–06 season, finishing last in their group after conceding 17 goals in 6 matches whilst scoring only 5, causing them to crash-out of the promotional play-offs. In 2005 National Football Challenge Cup Sui Gas finished third in their group, 2 points behind second placed Pakistan Navy as they missed out on the knock-out stages. In 2006-07 season, Sui Gas won the third place match against Bannu Red 2–1 after losing 0–1 to Pakistan Television in the semi-finals of the 2006 PFF Cup.

In 2007-08 season, Sui Gas topped their preliminary group in the second division finishing ahead of Pakistan Steel and Pakistan Public Work Department, although the club finished third in the "Super Six" group, just four points off of promotion to the Pakistan Premier League. In 2008 National Football Challenge Cup, Sui Gas was placed in group with league winners WAPDA and National Bank, losing both of their games 9–0 and 2–0 respectively.

Sui Gas finished as the group leaders in the 2008–09 second division, beating Sindh Government Press on goal differences for the first position, although they the semi-finals match against Pakistan Railways 1–0, missing out on the promotion to first division. Sui finished bottom of the group in 2009 National Football Challenge Cup, losing all of their matches 2–1, 2–1 and 4–3 to Pakistan Army, Pakistan Airlines and Pakistan Steel.

In 2009–10 second division, Sui Gas finished second in group behind Sindh Government Press, in semi-finals they defeated Higher Education Commission 4–0 and in finals they won against Pakistan Television 1–0 as they earn promotion to 2010–11 Pakistan Premier League. Sui Gas played a grand finals against club leg winners Young Blood, defeating them 1–0. In 2010 National Football Challenge Cup, they finished third in the group as they were crashed out of the tournament, they also competed in KPT-PFF Cup, also crashing out of the tournament after finishing bottom of the group.

Sui Gas relegated to second division after finishing 15 of 16 in the 2010–11 Pakistan Premier League, gaining only 20 points from 30 matches. Despite relegation, Asim Faiz of Sui Gas became first-ever player to be the second best scorer in the league with a season of 16 goals, 4 behind top-scorer Arif Mehmood who scored 20.

Rivalry
The club shares rivalry with Lahore-based Sui Northern Gas known as "The Sui Derby", although none of the team is actually from the district of Sui but works as gas providers for different provinces, with Southern Sui Gas providing gas to Sindh, while Sui Northern Gas provides gas to Punjab.

The first ever derby was played on 21 April 2015 in 2015 NBP National Challenge Cup, where Sui Southern Gas defeated Sui Northern Gas 6–2, which till date is the biggest win, biggest loss and highest scoring match respectively, the most recent derby was played on 12 December 2018 in 2018–19 Pakistan Premier League, where Sui Southern Gas won 2–1.

Results

Summary

Top scorers

Players

First-team squad

Staff

Coaching staff

Honours 
 PFF League: (1)
2009–10

References 

Football clubs in Pakistan
Works association football clubs in Pakistan